St. Thomas More Catholic High School (STM) is a co-educational, Roman Catholic high school located in Lafayette, Louisiana.  It opened its doors in 1982 and is named after the 16th-century saint Thomas More. It is owned and operated by the Roman Catholic Diocese of Lafayette.

Demographics 
The demographic breakdown of the 1,050 students enrolled in 2015-2016 was:
Native American/Alaskan - 0.2%
Asian/Pacific islanders - 1.1%
Black - 2.2%
Hispanic - 1.3%
White - 95.2%

Athletics
St. Thomas More Catholic athletics competes in the LHSAA. 

The school offers sports including football, cross country, swimming, basketball, baseball, softball, volleyball, tennis, wrestling, lacrosse, golf, dancing, bowling, and soccer. The STM mascot is the cougar.

Championships
Football championships
(13) State Championships: 2010, 2011, 2012, 2013, 2014, 2015, 2016, 2017, 2018, 2019, 2020, 2021, 2022

Notable alumni 
 Luke Lawton -  is a former NFL American football fullback, played college football at McNeese State.
 Mikie Mahtook - professional baseball outfielder for the Detroit Tigers  Major League Baseball.
 Brandon Mouton - former college basketball player at the University of Texas at Austin and member of the US national team at the 2003 Pan American Games.
 Lyle Mouton - Major League Baseball player, most notably for the Chicago White Sox.
 Andrew Stevenson - is an American professional baseball outfielder for the Washington Nationals of Major League Baseball (MLB).
 Javon Walker - played football for the Cougars and retired NFL WR, most notably for the Green Bay Packers of the NFL.

References

External links 
Official school website

Private high schools in Louisiana
Catholic secondary schools in Louisiana
Educational institutions established in 1983
Schools in Lafayette, Louisiana
1983 establishments in Louisiana